Bangana yunnanensis is a species of cyprinid fish endemic to Yunnan province in China.

References

Bangana
Taxa named by Wu Hsien-Wen
Taxa named by Lin Ren-Duan

Fish described in 1977